Kisdombegyház is a village in Békés County, in the Southern Great Plain region of south-east Hungary. Its population was 467 in 2015.

References

Populated places in Békés County